Kalnište is a neighborhood of Probištip town in the municipality of Probištip, North Macedonia.

Demographics
According to the 2002 census, the neighborhood had a total of 2,102 inhabitants. Ethnic groups in the village include:

Macedonians 2,079
Serbs 20
Romani 1
Other 2

References

Probištip Municipality